Woody's Roundup: A Rootin' Tootin' Collection of Woody's Favorite Songs (or simply Woody's Roundup) is a studio recording released by the Western band Riders in the Sky on August 29, 2000. It was released on Compact Disc.

This album is a collection of favorite Western tunes inspired by the Woody's Roundup TV show featured in the film Toy Story 2, including a number of original Riders compositions, songs by longtime Toy Story composer Randy Newman, and cover songs.

The album won the Grammy Award for Best Musical Album for Children at the Grammy Awards of 2001. The song "Woody's Roundup" was used by NASA to wake up the crew of STS-133.

Track listing

Personnel
Douglas B. Green (a.k.a. Ranger Doug) – guitar, vocals
Fred LaBour (a.k.a. Too Slim) – Bunkhouse Bass, guitar, vocals, sound effects
Paul Chrisman (a.k.a. Woody Paul) – fiddle, vocals
Joey Miskulin (a.k.a. Joey The Cowpolka King) – accordion, vocals, keyboard, percussion, sound effects
Devon Dawson - vocals on "Jessie, the Yodelin' Cowgirl" and "How Does She Yodel?"
Other instruments: Richard O'Brien (guitars), Jonathan Yudkin (fiddle), and Bob Mater (drums/percussion)
Six children singers on "Hey Howdy Hey"

References

External links
Riders in the Sky Official Website

Toy Story
2000 albums
Disney albums
Riders in the Sky (band) albums
Grammy Award for Best Musical Album for Children
Walt Disney Records albums